The 1983 PBA Open Conference Finals was the best-of-5 basketball championship series of the 1983 PBA Open Conference, and the conclusion of the conference playoffs.

The Crispa Redmanizers achieved a historic 2nd Grand Slam, repeating over Great Taste Coffee Makers, this time via 3–0 sweep in their best-of-five finals series.

Qualification

Games summary

Game 1

The Redmanizers engaged the Coffee Makers in a nip-and-tuck battle before coming up with a 9–2 windup in the last one minute and 55 seconds to pull off the victory. Behind 109–111, the Redmanizers equalized on a jumpshot by Atoy Co with 1:39 left before Philip Cezar put Crispa ahead for good, 113–111, on a fastbreak pitch by Billy Ray Bates with 59 seconds to go, Ricardo Brown of Great Taste missed a three-point shot and Bates put in what proved to be the winning points on a foul by Brown with 11 ticks remaining.

Game 2

From a 35–30 first period advantage, Crispa poured on the heat and was up by 22 points early in the third quarter, 73–51. The Coffee Makers tried to mount a rally but the closest they got was within eight points twice, the last at 123–131 with 3:25 left, another 14–5 flurry by the Redmanizers wrapped up the contest.

Game 3

Billy Ray Bates hit all of his first five jumpers, including a three-point shot in the last quarter as the black superman unleashed 21 of his 58 points in the final 12 minutes to spark the Redmanizers' runaway victory and a second grandslam. The see-saw encounter turned into a devastating rout through a 25–13 splurge for a 117–103 Crispa advantage.

Rosters

Broadcast notes

References

Crispa Redmanizers games
Great Taste Coffee Makers games
1983
1983 PBA season
PBA Open Conference Finals
PBA Open Conference Finals